Sophie Delong (born 17 July 1957) is a French politician member of The Republicans. She was member of the National Assembly of France. She represented the Haute-Marne department.

References

1957 births
Living people
People from Haute-Marne
Politicians from Grand Est
The Republicans (France) politicians
Union for a Popular Movement politicians
Deputies of the 13th National Assembly of the French Fifth Republic
Women members of the National Assembly (France)
21st-century French women politicians